Oldknow is a surname. Notable people with the surname include:

 James Oldknow (1873–1944), English cricketer
 Luke Oldknow (born 2001), Zimbabwean cricketer
 Octavius Thomas Oldknow (1786-1854) Mayor of Nottingham
 Samuel Oldknow (1756–1828), English cotton manufacturer

Other uses
 Oldknows Factory, Nottingham, a former lace factory